The Centers for Faith and Opportunity Initiative at the U.S. Department of Labor is an office under the direction of the Secretary of Labor.

It works to advance the secretary's mission by building partnerships with faith-based groups, community organizations, and neighborhood leaders. The office coordinates the outreach efforts of individual agencies within the Department to ensure a broad cross section of stakeholder participation in all facets of the department's efforts. The center works with the Office of Intergovernmental Affairs and the Office of Public Engagement to form the Secretary's Outreach Team.

References

External links
 

Public